Arthur Peterson Jr. (November 18, 1912 – October 31, 1996) was an American actor. He played character and supporting roles on stage, television, and feature films. On television, he played the Major in the TV series Soap (1977–1981).

Early life 
Born and raised in Mandan, North Dakota, Peterson first obtained a degree in theater from the University of Minnesota before becoming a professional actor with the first Federal Theatre Project. Peterson made his media debut in 1937 with the central role on the radio serial The Guiding Light. During World War II, Peterson fought within General Patton's Third Army.

Acting career 
In the era of old-time radio, Peterson portrayed Wilton Comstock on Bachelor's Children, Bill Baxter on The Baxters, Judge Parsons on The Tom Mix Ralston Straightshooters, and John Ruthledge on Guiding Light.

In 1949, Peterson appeared in the ABC network's first sitcom, That's O'Toole. In 1960, he appeared in the episode “The Peace Officer” (S6E6) in the TV Western Gunsmoke, as well as in 1961 as “Sam Frazer” in “A Man A Day” and in 1966 as a “Drunk” in “Champion of the World”.

Peterson's stage work included appearances in such plays as Inherit the Wind. His film career has been sporadic, including such titles as The Young Animals (AKA Born Wild) (1968) and the television movie Rollercoaster (1977). Peterson was guest artist at George Mason University, where he taught classes in acting and developed original materials such as The Monster, The Bride and Stephen based on the writings of Stephen Crane. He also co-authored with June August, a one-man show titled "Robert Frost: Fire and Ice", based on the life and works of the famous poet.

After the premiere of the one-man show at the Pasadena Playhouse Interim Theatre, Peterson spent 1981 to 1991 touring the United States with the Robert Frost piece, which alternated with a Pasadena Playhouse production of "The Gin Game," performed with his wife Norma, (a play previously performed on Broadway by Jessica Tandy and her husband Hume Cronyn). During Arthur's residency at George Mason, he met David Arrow, who was instrumental in bringing "Robert Frost: Fire and Ice" off-Broadway, where it played during the summer of 1984. Peterson also recorded the piece for AudioBooks. When the long run ended for these plays, Peterson retired from acting. He died on October 31, 1996, of Alzheimer's disease in the Amberwood Convalescent Hospital in Los Angeles 18 days before his 84th birthday.

Personal life 
Peterson was married to Norma Ransom, an actress whom he met when the two were students at the University of Minnesota.

Filmography

References

External links 

 

1912 births
1996 deaths
20th-century American male actors
American male radio actors
American male stage actors
American male television actors
Deaths from dementia in California
Deaths from Alzheimer's disease
People from Mandan, North Dakota
University of Minnesota College of Liberal Arts alumni